The East India Stock Dividend Redemption Act 1873 (36 & 37 Vict. c. 17) was an Act of the Parliament of the United Kingdom, passed in 1873, that formally dissolved the British East India Company.

The Act was one of the East India Loans Acts 1859 to 1893.

By the time of the Act's passing, the British East India Company had already effectively ceased to exist. The company's governmental responsibilities were transferred to the Crown and its liquidation was set in motion by the Government of India Act 1858. The company's 240,000-man military force had also been transferred to the authority of the Crown (subsequently being incorporated into the Indian Army), significantly reducing its influence.

References

Acts of the Parliament of the United Kingdom concerning India
Dividends
British East India Company
United Kingdom Acts of Parliament 1873